Alvin Morman (born January 6, 1969) is an American former Major League Baseball player. A pitcher, Morman played for the Houston Astros in 1996, Cleveland Indians in 1997 and 1998, San Francisco Giants also in 1998, and Kansas City Royals in 1999. Now retired, Morman works as a student counselor at Fuquay-Varina Middle School, in Fuquay-Varina, North Carolina.

External links
, or Retrosheet, or Pelota Binaria (Venezuelan Winter League)

1969 births
Living people
African-American baseball players
Asheville Tourists players
Baseball players from North Carolina
Buffalo Bisons (minor league) players
Cleveland Indians players
Fresno Grizzlies players
Gulf Coast Astros players
Houston Astros players
Jackson Generals (Texas League) players
Kansas City Royals players
Major League Baseball pitchers
Navegantes del Magallanes players
American expatriate baseball players in Venezuela
New Orleans Zephyrs players
Omaha Golden Spikes players
Osceola Astros players
People from Rockingham, North Carolina
San Francisco Giants players
Tucson Toros players
Wingate Bulldogs baseball players
21st-century African-American people
20th-century African-American sportspeople